Terinos tethys is a butterfly in the family Nymphalidae. It was described by William Chapman Hewitson in 1862. It is endemic to New Guinea in the Australasian realm.

Subspecies
T. t. tethys (Misool, New Guinea)
T. t. udaios Fruhstorfer, 1906 (New Guinea: Humboldt Bay) 
T. t. wahnesi Heller, 1902 (New Guinea: Huon Peninsula)

References

External links
Terinos at Markku Savela's Lepidoptera and Some Other Life Forms

Terinos
Butterflies described in 1862
Endemic fauna of New Guinea